Antezana or Andetxa is a hamlet and concejo located in the municipality of Vitoria-Gasteiz, in Álava province, Basque Country, Spain. It is located next to the terminal of Vitoria Airport, so it has good access via expressways.

Toponymy
The local council adopted a resolution on January 30, 2011 in which the name was changed from Antezana de Foronda to Antezana/Andetxa.

History
Antezana belonged to the municipality of Foronda, of which it was the capital, until it was absorbed by the Vitoria municipality in the 1970s. Vitoria Airport was built near the hamlet, which is the closest to the airport terminal.

Demographics
The population has declined significantly in recent decades. In 1960 it had 113 inhabitants and this has decreased over the years to 84 inhabitants in 2021.

Culture
The main building of the village is the church of San Miguel, dating from the eighteenth and nineteenth centuries. From 2014 to 2018, the interior of the church was painted with modern style murals. 

Local festivities take place on 29 September.

Notes

References

External links
 

Concejos in Vitoria-Gasteiz